Thermalright Inc. is a Taiwan-based company headquartered in Taipei, and established in 2001.

The company produces aftermarket heat sinks and other components for cooling desktop computers. Thermalright advertises its products as suitable for cooling processors from AMD and Intel.

Types of products 

CPU heat sinks
VGA heat sinks
Chipset heat sinks
MOSFET heat sinks
Memory heat sinks
Cooling fans
Other small accessories

Similar companies 
Arctic
Cooler Master
Deepcool

Notes

External links

2001 establishments in Taiwan
Computer hardware companies
Computer hardware cooling
Electronics companies established in 2001
Electronics companies of Taiwan
Taiwanese brands